Wow! Flash is the third studio album by Elvis Crespo.

The song "Wow Flash" is featured in the film Training Day (2001).  It is the first album that from singing merengue also contains songs in pop.

Track listing
 "Wow Flash!" (Merengue)
 "Bella Flor"
 "No Me Olvidaras" (Merengue)
 "Mi Sol, Mi Luna"
 "Me Mata
 "Cuando Me Entrego Al Amor"
 "La Bolita"
  "La Noche"
 "Mares De Emocion"
 "Solos Tu Y Yo"
 "El Regalito"
 "No Me Olvidaras" (Balada)
 "Wow Flash" (Pop Version)

Sales and certifications

See also
List of number-one Billboard Tropical Albums from the 2000s

References 

Elvis Crespo albums
2000 albums